Khalid bin Sultan Al Qasimi (6 April 1980 in Sharjah – 1 July 2019 in London), known professionally as  Khalid Al Qasimi, was an Emirati royal and fashion designer in London who founded the Qasimi fashion label. He was the second son of Sultan bin Muhammad Al-Qasimi, who has been ruler of the Emirate of Sharjah since 1972. 
Al Qasimi died on 1 July 2019 in London as a result of drug overdose.

Early life and education
Al Qasimi was born on 6 April 1980. He moved to London when he was nine years old and was educated at the Tonbridge School in Kent. In 2004, Al Qasimi won two golden prizes in the First Arab-Euro Festival for Photography which was organised by the Arab Photographers Union in Europe under the theme of "History, technique and heritage." Al Qasimi studied architecture and fashion design at Central Saint Martins in London.

Career
He established the British clothing chain Qasimi Homme in 2008. There he was the founder and creative director. As fashion designer he is best known for having incorporated Arab elements in his male and female costume designs. Much of Al Qasimi's women's collection was inspired by the Gulf’s colourful jalabiya dresses. Al Qasimi said models should "resemble warriors walking out of a crypt and down the runway." His designs have been shown as part of London and Paris Fashion Weeks. Among some of the celebrities who have worn Qasimi outfits include Lady Gaga, Florence Welch and Cheryl Cole. 

In an interview with Japan Fashion TV Al Qasimi said: "Qasimi is a way for me to discuss what's going on around us whether it is politics or economics". Some of his designs included £115 ($144) T-shirts with the writing in Arabic, that read: "Press. Don't Shoot." 

Al Qasimi was the chairman of the Sharjah Urban Planning Council as well as the leader of the region’s first international platform for architecture, the Sharjah Architecture Triennial – a non-profit initiative funded by the Government of Sharjah, to focus on encouraging dialogue on architecture and urbanism in the Middle East, North Africa, and South Asia – set to take place at the end of 2019.

Personal life
Khalid bin Sultan Al Qasimi was the son of Sheikh Sultan bin Muhammad Al-Qasimi, the current ruler of Sharjah, and hailed from the emirate's royal Al Qasimi family. He had three sisters, one half sister and a half-brother, according to the official biography of Sharjah ruler Sheikh Sultan bin Mohamed Al Qasimi. His twin sister, Hoor bint Sultan Al Qasimi, is the director of the Sharjah Art Foundation.

Khalid's older half-brother, Sheikh Mohammed bin Sultan Al Qasimi, died of a heroin overdose in 1999 at the family's English manor house in Sussex.

Al Qasimi was found dead in his London penthouse apartment in Knightsbridge on 1 July 2019. Three days of national mourning across the UAE were declared, beginning with flags to be flown at half mast. He was laid to rest on 3 July at Jubail Cemetery. His father posted images and a video of the funeral prayers on Instagram. During his funeral his father was flanked by his fellow rulers, including Sheikh Saud bin Saqr Al Qasimi, ruler of Ras Al Khaimah, Sheikh Humaid bin Rashid Al Nuaimi, ruler of Ajman, and Sheikh Ammar bin Humaid Al Nuaimi, Crown Prince of Ajman, Sheikh Saif bin Zayed Al Nahyan, deputy prime minister and minister of interior, and Sheikh Nahyan bin Mubarak Al Nahyan, minister of tolerance.

On 11 December 2019 a hearing was held at Westminster Coroner's Court about the circumstances of Al Qasimi's death. Al Qasimi had spent his final hours on the night before his death partying according to the toxicology report by Dr Susan Patterson he had high levels (more than 300mg) of the sex-drug GHB and cocaine in his system. Detective Sergeant Adrian De Villiers, who investigated his death, stated: ″There is no suggestion of anybody acting in a way to give or make Khalid take these drugs″. Relatives of the Prince were not present. Coroner Bernard Richmond QC gave a verdict of drugs-related death.

References

External links
 Official website of the menswear label Qasimi

Emirati fashion designers
Khalid bin Sultan Al Qasimi
People from the Emirate of Sharjah
Emirati expatriates in the United Kingdom
People educated at Tonbridge School
Alumni of Central Saint Martins
2019 deaths
1980 births
Sons of monarchs